Walter Carl Otto Busse  (1868 – 1933) was a German botanist, whose primary scholarly focus was on German agriculture and the plants, fungi and lichen of Africa.

Life 
Busse was born in Berlin, Germany on 7 December 1868. He received his Ph.D. from the University of Freiburg in 1892. His first posting was in the German Imperial Health Office (Kaiserliche Gesundheitsamt).  He then went on to work in the Imperial Biological Institute (Biologische Reichsanstalt) in Dahlem. In 1900 he made a plant collecting expedition to Africa.  He then travelled to the Bogor Botanical Gardens (then called the Botanical Gardens in Buitenzorg) in Java to make a study of Cinchona species which have medicinal value as a source of quinine. In 1903 he returned to Africa to make collections in Tanzania, Cameroon and Togo, before returning to Germany in 1905. Following the founding of the Imperial Colonial Office he transferred to the Department for Agriculture and Forestry. His work on tobacco and alfalfa during this time was notable. In this position he travelled to Central Asia, the Caucasus, Crimea, Turkey and North America. In 1926 he was made Privy Councilor  on agricultural matters for the Weimar Republic to the International Institute of Agriculture in Rome. He retired in 1919.

Work 
During his collecting trips to Africa he was charged with assessing local woody plant species for use in commercial purposes. In addition to the many plant specimens he acquired and described, he was also noted for the photographs he took while collecting.

Legacy 
He is the authority for at least 31 taxa including: 

Several species are named in his honor including:
Acalypha bussei Hutch.
Abutilon bussei Gürke ex Ulbr.
Aloe bussei A.Berger
Aspilia bussei O.Hoffm. & Muschl.
Brachystegia bussei Harms
Diospyros bussei Gürke
Dissotidendron bussei (Gilg ex Engl.) Ver.-Lib. & G.Kadereit
Entandrophragma bussei Harms ex Engl.
Euphorbia bussei Pax
Excoecaria bussei (Pax) Pax
Ficus bussei Warb. ex Mildbr. & Burret
Galium bussei K.Schum. & K.Krause
Heinsia bussei Verdc.
Hexalobus bussei Diels
Indigofera bussei J.B.Gillett
Maerua bussei (Gilg & Gilg-Ben.) R.Wilczek
Millettia bussei Harms
Oliverella bussei (Sprague) Polhill & Wiens
Philenoptera bussei (Harms) Schrire
Rhodopentas bussei (K.Krause) Kårehed & B.Bremer
Rinorea bussei M.Brandt
Salacia bussei Loes.
Scilla bussei Dammer
Tetracera bussei Gilg
Vachellia bussei (Harms ex Y.Sjöstedt) Kyal. & Boatwr.

References 

19th-century German botanists
1865 births
1933 deaths
University of Freiburg alumni
20th-century German botanists